The Missoula County Courthouse is located in Missoula, Montana, in the center of Downtown Missoula. It is located at 200 West Broadway, Missoula Montana. It was added to the National Register of Historic Places listings on September 1, 1976.

It is a two-story building on an elevated basement, with walls of native sandstone.  It was designed by Missoula architect A.J. Gibson and built during 1908-10 by Spokane contractor Williams & Oliver Co. on the site of the previous county courthouse.

References

County courthouses in Montana
National Register of Historic Places in Missoula, Montana
Clock towers in Montana
Courthouses on the National Register of Historic Places in Montana
Neoclassical architecture in Montana
1908 establishments in Montana
Sandstone buildings in the United States
Government buildings completed in 1908